Craig Ward Anton (born August 28, 1962) is an American actor and comedian. He is best known for his roles as Mr. Pettus in Lizzie McGuire and Lloyd Diffy in Phil of the Future.

Early life
Anton was born and raised in Omaha, Nebraska, the eldest son of Antoinette (Akromis) and Arthur Ward Anton. He has a younger brother, Brian, and two sisters, Toni and Megan. Anton graduated from Omaha Burke High School in 1980, and the University of Nebraska at Lincoln in 1996.

Career
Anton started acting as a kid in Omaha, Nebraska and made his career as a stand-up comedian at age 17, performing in comedy clubs in 1978 while in high school. He attended the University of Nebraska and graduated in 1983 with a B.A. in Theater and English. Anton began his career as a college circuit comedian in the 1980s.  In 1984, he traveled the Mediterranean and Middle East as part of an all-comedy USO tour, spending two months in Turkey, Greece, Bahrain, Italy, Israel and Spain entertaining troops. In 1985, he was named Showtime's Funniest Person in Nebraska. In the late 1980s, Anton moved to New York City and pursued some acting opportunities, then moved to Los Angeles. He currently teaches at SCAD in Savannah, Georgia.

Awards and nominations
Anton was nominated for the National Association for Campus Activities Campus Entertainer of the Year award three times.

2 Headed Dog
He is a member of comedy group 2 Headed Dog with comedians Jim Turner, Mark Fite, and Dave (Gruber) Allen.

First Time Out and MADtv
In the fall of 1995, Anton booked two TV pilots in Los Angeles. He was cast as Nathan in The WB sitcom First Time Out which premiered in September and was later cast on the FOX sketch comedy series MADtv in October. Anton's other show First Time Out was quickly cancelled two months after the premiere of MADtv. His most enduring character was Clorox from the "Star Trek: Deep Stain Nine" sketches. Clorox was supposed to be the main nemesis of the sketch and he was loosely based on Q from Star Trek. He impersonated Dennis Miller and Nate Richert before leaving the show in 1998 at the end of the third season.

Other television projects
Since leaving MADtv, Anton developed an extensive resume on television. He has made appearances on such television series as Mr. Show with Bob and David, Coach, Boston Legal, Entourage, Curb Your Enthusiasm, The King of Queens, Ally McBeal,  Lizzie McGuire, Phil of the Future, Everybody Loves Raymond, Weekends at the D.L., 2 Broke Girls, and Mad Men.  After leaving MADtv Craig was cast as Mr. Pettus in Lizzie McGuire. After Season 1 ended Craig Anton left the show. He was eventually cast as Lloyd Diffy in Phil of the Future.

Film projects
Anton has appeared in such films as Mail Bonding (1995), Deliver Us From Eva (2003), The Goldfish (2003), Run Ronnie Run (2002), D-WAR (2005), and Careless (2007). He also took part in the feature film is The Mother of Invention (2010).

Voice acting projects
In 2004, Anton starred in the animated series Tom Goes to the Mayor. He provided the voice (and body) of one of the three city council members.

Tomorrow Show
Along with comedians Ron Lynch and Brendon Small, Craig hosted the Tomorrow Show, a weekly live comedy show at the Steve Allen Theater in Los Angeles, California. Though Anton and Small are no longer actively involved with the show the two occasionally make surprise appearances including a yearly anniversary performance.

Personal life
Anton married Lesley Gray in September 1994. They have twin daughters. They currently live in Savannah, Georgia.

Filmography

Film

Television

References

External links

1962 births
Living people
American male film actors
American stand-up comedians
American male television actors
American male voice actors
Male actors from Omaha, Nebraska
American sketch comedians
20th-century American comedians
21st-century American comedians
University of Nebraska alumni
Comedians from Nebraska